White label records are vinyl records with plain white labels attached.

White label may also refer to:
 White Label, an album by Venetian Snares
 White Label Music, an independent record label based in the United Kingdom
 White Label Records, an imprint of Mushroom Records
 White-label ABMs, automatic banking machines not operated by a bank or credit union
 White-label product, a permitted replication and rebranding of a product